Dover Harbor may refer to:
Dover Harbor (Pullman car), a passenger railroad car
Port of Dover, a cross-channel port situated in Dover, Kent, south-east England